The Guilford Quakers football team represents Guilford College in the sport of college football. The NCAA Division III team first competed in 1893.

Head coach Bear Bryant won his first career game against the Quakers as a coach with Maryland in 1945.

References

 
American football teams established in 1893
1893 establishments in North Carolina